Minuartiella is a genus of flowering plants belonging to the family Caryophyllaceae.

Its native range is Turkey to Iran.

Species
Species:

Minuartiella acuminata 
Minuartiella × antalyensis 
Minuartiella dianthifolia 
Minuartiella elmalia 
Minuartiella pestalozzae 
Minuartiella serpentinicola

References

Caryophyllaceae
Caryophyllaceae genera